Olshanka is a rural locality (a khutor) and the administrative center of Olshanskoye Rural Settlement, Uryupinsky District, Volgograd Oblast, Russia. The population was 1,763 as of 2010. There are 19 streets.

Geography 
Olshanka is located in steppe, 4 km northeast of Uryupinsk (the district's administrative centre) by road. Popov is the nearest rural locality.

References 

Rural localities in Uryupinsky District